The northeastern Indian state of Manipur has a relatively large population of Tamils, largely concentrated near the border of Myanmar. The town of Moreh in particular has an estimated 17,000 Tamils. Tamils in Manipur have relatives and business contacts in Myanmar, which is a valuable network facilitating cross-border trade.

History
Tamils from Burma came back to India when General Ne Win nationalized banks, shops, and factories. Some of them found life in refugee camps in Tamil Nadu very hard, so they decided to return to Burma through land. They were stopped by Burmese immigration at the border town of Moreh and settled there as a result.

Around 1992, there were clashes between the Tamil and Kuki communities due to attempts by Kuki militants to impose heavy taxes on Tamil businesses.

Very recently, the Tamil community has been involved in a legal battle to prevent the Manipur government from giving up land occupied by Sri Angala Parameshwari Sri Muneeswarar temple to Myanmar. One of the gates of this temple is in Burmese territory.

Religion
Other than the Sri Angala Parameshwari Sri Muneeswarar temple mentioned, the Tamil Hindu temples in Moreh are Sree Veeramma Kali Temple, Sree Badrakaali Temple, and the Sree Periyapalayathamman temple. There is also a Tamil mosque, known as the Tamir-E-Millath Jamia Masjid, and a Tamil Catholic church, the St. George Church, in Moreh.

The Kanchi Kamakoti Peetham has been involved in spiritual activities in Manipur.

Entertainment
Over the past several years, Tamil films have become slowly popular in Manipur partly due to a ban on Hindi language entertainment by militant groups such as the People's Revolutionary Party of Kangleipak (PREPAK).

References

Ethnic groups in Manipur
Cities and towns in Manipur
Tamil society